Bailey Road is a well-known thoroughfare in Dhaka, the capital city of Bangladesh. It is a classic road in Dhaka. It runs through Shantinagar, connecting the Kakrail-Ramna road with the Siddheshwari junction. It is generally regarded as one of the classier areas of the city. The Bailey Road is considered as two distinct roads, one after another, they are the new Bailey Road and the Bailey Road. The new Bailey Road is well recognised for its famous theatres, numerous boutiques, shops, schools, fast foods, restaurants and various hangout places. The other Bailey Road is reputable because of the officers club, Foreign Service academy and homes of ministers, officers and government officials. Bailey Road was featured in a song of the same name by Ayub Bachchu, lead singer of the popular rock band LRB. Bailey Road was officially renamed Natok Soroni (Theater Street), in recognition of the road's contributions to performing arts in the capital.

Significance of the name Bailey Road

Bailey Road was named in honour of Sir Steuart Colvin Bayley, Lieutenant-Governor of Bengal from 1879 to 1882. However, in recognition of Bailey Road's importance to the theatre community of Dhaka, on 26 August 2005 the Mayor of Dhaka, Sadek Hosen Khoka, announced that the name of the road would change to Natok Soroni, meaning "Theater Road". Theater personalities present during the name changing ceremony were Sayed Ahmed, Liakat Ali Lucky, M Hamid, Ramendu Majumdar and Mamunur Rashid.

History

Ramna was a forest like area during the British reign. Initially, Charles dos, the magistrate of Dhaka was responsible for its development. He transformed that area into a race course and garden, where the high class and rich people of that time used to visit. At 1840 developed into a small town. Gradually people started building houses at the north side of Ramna. In 1859 surveyor general divided Ramna into two different parts, and they are the Ramna plains and the race course. Government tried to modify the Ramna plains and turn it into the new capital city. He wanted to achieve this by building roads through 100 acre of Greenland. Beside the roads where several great buildings made for the residence of higher officials such as governor, justice, council members, secretary and division heads. Coming back from the scenes of Mughal Empire, even today Ramna has remained as one of the most notable and sophisticated areas. Bailey Road which lies between Ramna is also one of the most prominent and prestigious roads in Dhaka.

Theater Street

Bailey Road in the capital widely known as Natokpara has been centre of our theatre practices as well as theatre performers. The stage productions of Dhaka's major drama companies are usually performed in Bailey Road. Over the years, its theatres have played host to some of the country's best actors and actresses. The two major theatres on the road that regularly host local and international theatre performances are:

Guide House Auditorium 

The Guide House was established in 1964 as the headquarters of the East Pakistan Branch of the Pakistan Girl Guides Association. The auditorium was built in 1982 to create a funding stream for what was by then the Bangladesh Girl Guides Association. In 2003–04 the auditorium underwent a structural upgrade with advice from eminent theatre personalities M Hamid, Jamaluddin and Nasiruddin Yusuf.

Mahila Samity auditorium 

Mahila Samity auditorium is a centre for stage productions, located in the building of the Bangladesh Mahila Samiti. Closed for renovations in 2011, it reopened in 2016.

Shopping and eateries

The street is also popular among Dhaka's residents for its quality book shops, clothing boutiques (i.e. the Jamdani sari stores), and fast food shops.

Eateries:

Bailey Road played an important role in popularising fast food culture in Dhaka in the late 1980s and early 1990s. Fast food shops such as Swiss and Euro Hut featured burgers, fries, fried chicken, etc. in their menus – at the time a novelty in Bangladesh. These eateries gained great popularity among urban youth, triggering later waves of fast food retail across the entire city. The area now features fast food shops Palki, Bailey Garden Restaurant, Bamboo Castle, Oasis, New Dahlia's, Chicken King, La Vista, Hot Cake, Euro Hut, Golpea Burger, Golden Food Golden Food, Boomers, Sausage, Bamboo Castle, Al-Baik,  Sabaro, Sub zero, Euro-Hut and Domino's Pizza. It also features Pitha Ghar, a place for indigenous Bengali sweetmeat (known as Pitha) such as Prominent, Rosh, Capital confectionery, Chom Chom Sweetmeat and Swiss Bakery, one of the oldest confectioneries in Dhaka. Eateries in Bailey Road overall offer both desi and continental foods.

Shopping centres and Boutiques:

Bailey Road is a prominent place for shopping. Traditional and local sarees and dresses are sold there. The major boutiques in Bailey Road include the handloom sari shops, like Tangali Sari Kutir and Jamdani Sari Kutir. Sarees such as jamdani, katan, muslin, cotton, tangali etc. are vastly sold each day. Bailey Road is that there are several shopping malls such as Bailey Star. Also it has numerous brand stores which like Celebration, Pride, Fit Elegance, Lubnan, Richman, Rex, Ecstasy, Moods, Shada Kalo, and many more. In 2006, Khaleda Zia, the Prime Minister of Bangladesh, made gift of silk Jamdani saris from the former to Gursharan Kaur, wife of the Indian Prime Minister Manmohan Singh, and Sonia Gandhi, chief of ruling Indian National Congress.

Education

Bailey Road is within reaching distance of a number of academic institutions. . Two of the most famous educational institutions namely Viqarunnisa Noon School and College and Siddeshwari Girls' School & College are situated at this road.

Viqarunnisa Noon School and college:

Viqarunnisa Noon School is an all-girls' school, it has about 24,000 students and links with the history of the entire South Asian subcontinent. Viqarunnisa Noon School is one of the renowned schools in Bangladesh. It was established in 1952 by Begum Viqar un Nisa Noon, wife of Firoz Khan Noon, the then governor of East Pakistan. From that, till today, this school is keeping its image equally remarkable in the sky of Educational institutions. Viqarunnisa Noon College is a centre for higher secondary education in Bailey Road, Dhaka, Bangladesh. It was established in 1978. The college took the first place in the combined merit list of the Higher Secondary Certificate examinations and seven times in twelve years between 1994 and 2006.

Siddeshwari Girls' School & College:

Siddheswari Girls' school and College from its very inception in 1966 has been playing a key role in women education. A huge number of women educated in this college are now established in various fields of the society. They are contributing to the development of the women community as well as the country. With the span of time, Siddheswari Girls' College has expanded its academic activities and infrastructure. Now it is grooming up as many as 5000 students at Higher Secondary Graduate and Post Graduate Levels. In its long journey, the college has got contribution from its Honorable Principal and honourable teachers.

Officers' Club

Officers' Club was established in 1967 on 4.5 acres (18,000 m2) land in a picturesque setting at Ramna (Bailey Road), Dhaka, Bangladesh. Its membership is open only to government officers and the officers of semi-government or autonomous bodies. The land with a colonial building was once given to the club by the PWD (Public Works Dept.). The government also provided funds to construct an auditorium, covered badminton complex, swimming pool and tennis courts etc. The club has now about 2,000 members and run by an executive committee headed by the cabinet secretary of the government. Its members are elected through secret ballot every two years. The club has a library, a newly built 2-storey auditorium, three tennis courts, and facilities to play badminton, table tennis, billiards, cards, chess etc.

Foreign Service Academy

Foreign Service Academy a training institute to look after the training needs of the Ministry of Foreign Affairs and of the Bangladesh Civil Service (BCS) cadres. Formerly known as the Foreign Affairs Training Institute, it was merged with Bangladesh civil service administration academy in 1987. The Academy was inaugurated on 1 January 1997, and temporarily housed at the State guest house 'Sugandha'.

Residence of officials and ministers

Many government officials, officers and ministers reside in Bailey Road. The ancient homes called 'lal bari' are placed there, where the ministers live.

References

Further reading
 Muntasir Mamun (2010). Dhaka: Sriti Bisritir Nogori.

External links 
 Theater in Bangaledsh
 Dhaka City Map
 Army map of Bailey Road

Transport in Dhaka
Neighbourhoods in Dhaka
Streets in Dhaka